U.S. Route 11E (US 11E) is a divided highway of US 11 in the U.S. states of Tennessee and Virginia. The United States Numbered Highway, which is complemented by US 11W to the north and west, runs  from US 11, US 11W, and US 70 in Knoxville, Tennessee, north and east to US 11, US 11W, US 19, and US 421 in Bristol, Virginia. US 11E connects Knoxville and the twin cities of Bristol, Virginia, and Bristol, Tennessee, with the East Tennessee communities of Morristown, Greeneville, and Johnson City. The U.S. Highway runs concurrently with US 70 and US 25W east of Knoxville, US 321 from Greeneville and Johnson City, and both US 19W and US 19 between Johnson City and Bristol. US 11E also has an unsigned concurrency with State Route 34 (SR 34) for almost all of its course in Tennessee.

Route description

|-
|
|
|-
|
|
|-
|Total
|
|}

Knoxville to Morristown
US 11E begins at an intersection with the northern terminus of mainline US 11 in Tennessee, the southern end of US 11W, and US 70 in Knoxville. US 11 and US 70 head west as Magnolia Avenue toward Zoo Knoxville and Downtown Knoxville; US 11W heads northeast along Rutledge Pike. US 11E heads east together with US 70 as Asheville Highway, a four-lane divided highway that leaves the city of Knoxville at its diamond interchange with Interstate 40 (I-40). US 11E and US 70 are joined by US 25W at the I-40 interchange; the three highways use the J. Will Taylor Bridge to cross the Holston River and meet the eastern end of SR 168 (Governor John Sevier Highway). At Carter (also known as Trentville), US 25W and US 70 continue east as Asheville Highway while US 11E splits northeast as four-lane divided Andrew Johnson Highway. The U.S. Highway crosses the Knox–Jefferson county line in Strawberry Plains, where the highway intersects SR 139 (Old Dandridge Pike).

US 11E passes through the town of New Market on its way to Jefferson City, which contains Carson–Newman University. At the west end of the town, the U.S. Highway intersects SR 92, which follows a part of US 11E's old alignment, Old Andrew Johnson Highway. SR 92 runs concurrently with US 11E to south of downtown Jefferson City, where it heads south toward the county seat of Dandridge. US 11E crosses over Norfolk Southern Railway's Knoxville East District and enters Hamblen County at Talbott, where the highway intersects SR 341 (Talbott Kansas Road). The U.S. Highway continues through Alpha (which has been annexed by the city of Morristown), the site of several industrial parks, Morristown Regional Airport, and the highway's southern intersection with SR 342 and the northern terminus of SR 160 (Air Park Boulevard). The two highways run concurrently until SR 342 heads north as Panther Creek Road toward Panther Creek State Park just west of the city limits of Morristown.

Morristown to Johnson City
US 11E heads through a commercial area along Andrew Johnson Highway to west of downtown Morristown, where the highway turns southeast onto Morris Boulevard, a five-lane road with center turn lane that crosses the railroad tracks and passes through an industrial area where the highway intersects SR 66 (Fairmont Avenue). US 11E intersects SR 343 (Cumberland Street) and passes College Square Mall before reaching a partial cloverleaf interchange with US 25E (Davy Crockett Parkway). US 11E heads north along the freeway for  before another partial cloverleaf interchange where the highway becomes concurrent with SR 66 along Andrew Johnson Highway. The two highways closely parallel the railroad line as a two-lane road and leave the city limits of Morristown just west of Russellville, where SR 344 splits northeast along Old Russellville Pike. US 11E and SR 66 pass through Whitesburg shortly before curving southeast and entering Hawkins County. The U.S. and state highways diverge in the town of Bulls Gap shortly before US 11E crosses a perpendicular rail line and follows the Knoxville East District through Bulls Gap, a low point in Bays Mountain.

US 11E continues southeast into Greene County and Mosheim city limits, where the highway expands to a four-lane divided highway after it passes Volunteer Speedway and has a diamond interchange with I-81. The U.S. Highway crosses Lick Creek and passes through the town of Mosheim before reaching the town of Greeneville the home of Andrew Johnson National Historic Site. On westside of the town, US 11E has a partial cloverleaf interchange with Blue Springs Parkway, which heads east as US 11E Business and SR 70 (Summer Street). SR 70 joins the U.S. Highway for a short distance before heading north as Lonesome Pine Trail. US 11E has an interchange with SR 172 (Baileyton Road) before closely spaced intersections with US 321 (North Main Street), which joins US 11E in a concurrency, and the southern terminus of SR 93 (Kingsport Highway). After crossing the Knoxville East rail line, the U.S. Highway receives the eastern end of its business route and SR 107 (Tusculum Boulevard).  SR 107 runs concurrently with the U.S. Highways east to the city of Tusculum, where the state highway heads southeast as Tusculum Bypass then as Erwin Highway and passes Tusculum University.

US 11E and US 321 head northeast and cross over the rail line at Afton. The two highways intersect SR 351 (Rheatown Road) north of the community of Chuckey. The U.S. Highways also pass to the north of David Crockett Birthplace State Park before entering Washington County, where the highways pass along the north edge of Limestone, meet the south end of SR 75 (Opie Arnold Road), and cross Big Limestone Creek. US 11E and US 321 intersect SR 81 (College Street) and SR 354 (Boones Creek Road) on the west and east sides, respectively, of the town of Jonesborough. The U.S. Highways enter the city of Johnson City at their crossing of a north–south rail line. Just east of the downtown, where US 11E becomes Market Street, US 321 turns south onto State of Franklin Road, a western boulevard bypass of Johnson City that heads north as SR 381. US 11E passes to the north of Mountain Home, the site of several hospitals, including a VA medical center. East of University Parkway, which serves the campus of East Tennessee State University, the U.S. Highway curves north while SR 91 continues east along the one-way pair of Main and Market streets to serve downtown Johnson City.

Johnson City to Bristol

US 11E heads north past Science Hill High School to Roan Street, the main north–south street of downtown Johnson City that the U.S. Highway joins. The highway passes the Mall at Johnson City and meets I-26 and US 23 at a partial cloverleaf interchange. US 19W joins US 11E at the interchange; when Roan Street continues north as SR 36, the two U.S. Highways curve northeast as Bristol Highway, which meets the northern end of SR 381 (State of Franklin Road) at an interchange. The highways head northeast and cross the Watauga River arm of Boone Lake and enter Sullivan County. In the town of Bluff City, US 11E and US 19W curve north while SR 44 (Bluff City Highway) continues north into downtown Bluff City. Just north of SR 44, the U.S. highways meet the northern end of US 19E; US 11E continues north concurrent with mainline US 19 and crosses the South Fork Holston River.

US 11E and US 19 have a diamond interchange with SR 394 just west of the state highway's junction with SR 390 (Bluff City Highway). The U.S. Highways cross Beaver Creek adjacent to Bristol Motor Speedway and follow the stream's valley between the Whitetop Knobs to the east and the Beaver Creek Knobs to the west. US 11E and US 19 enter the city of Bristol and follow Volunteer Parkway to the Tennessee–Virginia state line. State Street, which heads west as SR 1, follows the boundary and serves as the main street of both cities Bristol. The two U.S. Highways and State Route 381 (SR 381) head north into the independent city of Bristol along Commonwealth Avenue, a four-lane divided highway that intersects Goode Street one block north of the state line; Goode Street carries US 421 and both US 11 Truck and US 19 Truck through the Bristol Commercial Historic District. US 11E, US 19, US 421, and SR 381 meet the southern end of SR 113 at separate intersections: Cumberland Street carries northbound SR 113 east and Sycamore Street carries the westbound direction. The four highways continue north to east–west Euclid Avenue, where US 11E has its northern terminus. SR 381 continues north along Commonwealth Avenue to the southern end of I-381, a spur south from I-81. Westbound Euclid Avenue heads west carrying northbound US 421 and southbound US 11W. At this intersection, US 11E and US 11W come together to form mainline US 11, which follows eastbound Euclid Avenue with northbound US 19.

History

Major intersections

Greeneville business route

U.S. Route 11E Business (US 11E Bus.) is a business route of US 11E in Greeneville, Tennessee. The highway runs  between junctions with US 11E on the west and east sides of Greeneville. US 11E Bus. begins at a partial cloverleaf interchange with US 11E (Andrew Johnson Highway) and SR 70. East of where SR 70 splits to the south, the business route enters the town as Summer Street. In the downtown area, US 11E Bus. turns north onto Main Street, joining US 321 and SR 107. The business route and SR 107 turn east onto Tusculum Boulevard, which they follow out of the downtown area and pass through a heavily congested area (they also pass Walters State Community College's Greeneville campus and Greeneville High School) to the business route's eastern terminus at US 11E.

References

External links

Virginia Highways Project: US 11E
US 11E in VA at AARoads

11 E
11 E
11 E
U.S. Route 011E
Transportation in Sullivan County, Tennessee
Transportation in Washington County, Tennessee
Transportation in Greene County, Tennessee
Transportation in Hawkins County, Tennessee
Transportation in Hamblen County, Tennessee
Transportation in Jefferson County, Tennessee
Transportation in Knox County, Tennessee
E
Transportation in Knoxville, Tennessee